Poston Butte High School is a high school in San Tan Valley, Arizona in the Florence Unified School District. It opened July 20, 2009.

One-to-one computing
Poston Butte High School does not employ textbooks. Instead, the school's one-to-one computing policy provides a laptop to each student in lieu of textbooks.

The first school to use one-to-one computing in Arizona was Empire High School, which started doing so in 2005. Florence district officials worked with Empire to implement a similar program at Poston Butte in 2009. After successful implementation at Poston Butte, it was expanded to Florence High School in 2010.

First graduating class
The first class graduated from Poston Butte on May 30, 2012. It had 253 students.

References

External links

Schools in Pinal County, Arizona
Public high schools in Arizona
2009 establishments in Arizona